The 2015 Circuito Schin Stock Car Brasil season was the thirty-seventh season of the Stock Car Brasil. The season began at the Goiânia in March and ended at the Interlagos in December. The 2015 Stock Car Brasil consists of four main support championships which support the championship at almost every round, along with several smaller championships supporting one or two events. Marcos Gomes was the champion of the season.

Teams and drivers

Team changes
 AMG Motorsport return for the official name after Mobil reduced support in the team.
 Hanier Racing is now called Cavaleiro Racing with the acquisition of 100% of corporate shares by Beto Cavaleiro. Textiles Hanier left the championship.
 ProGP scaled back to a single car operation.
 RC3 Bassani returned to operating as a two-car team and the team changed name to União Química Bassani for sponsorship reasons.

Driver changes

Changed teams
 Popó Bueno left Shell Racing and joined Total Racing.
 Luciano Burti changed teams from Vogel Motorsport to RZ Motorsport.
 Fábio Fogaça left the Schin Racing Team and moved to Hot Car Competições.
 Alceu Feldmann returned to Boettger Competições, having competed for the team from 2005 to 2009.
 Bia Figueiredo and Rafael Suzuki, who raced for ProGP in 2014, will join União Química Racing and RZ Motorsport respectively.
 Lucas Foresti switched from RC3 Bassani to AMG Motorsport.
 Felipe Fraga and Marcos Gomes joined Voxx Racing, leaving Vogel Motorsport and the Schin Racing Team respectively.
 Sérgio Jimenez left Voxx Racing to race for the Axalta C2 Team.
 Felipe Lapenna and Raphael Matos left Hot Car Competições to join the Schin Racing Team.
 Denis Navarro and Diego Nunes joined Vogel Motorsport, leaving Voxx Racing and the Axalta C2 Team respectively.
 Tuka Rocha left RZ Motorsport and moved to União Quimica Racing.
 After seven seasons racing for his own team, Ricardo Zonta switched to Shell Racing.

Entering/re-entering the series
 Campeonato Brasileiro de Turismo runner-up Raphael Abbate will debut in the series, with Hot Car Competições.
 César Ramos, who competed for Belgian Audi Club Team WRT in the Blancpain Endurance and Sprint championships in 2014, joined Total Racing in 2015. Ramos competed as a wildcard at the first round in 2014, with Ipiranga-RCM.

Leaving the series
 Beto Cavaleiro will not return to the series in 2015, and will focus on running the Cavaleiro Racing.
 Nonô Figueiredo announced his retirement from Stock Car after three wins and fifteen seasons.

 Lico Kaesemodel, Felipe Tozzo, Mauri Zacarelli, Wellington Justino, Felipe Gama and Vicente Orige competed part-time in 2014 and will not return in 2015.

In-season changes
 After first round ProGP did not compete until fourth round, returning at fifth round with the rookie Gustavo Lima.
 Alceu Feldmann leaves Boettger Competições after first round. Boettger return to operate two cars in seventh round with Pedro Boesel and the last three rounds with Felipe Guimarães.
 Cacá Bueno had been suspended in court after offending the marshals on team radio after his victory in the first race at Ribeirão Preto - when he crossed the line, he kept racing in front of Marcos Gomes because the chequered flag was not waved at neither of them in the occasion by mistake. After competing in the first round as a wildcard driver, Laurens Vanthoor replaces Bueno at Red Bull Racing.
 Fábio Fogaça was fired on Hot Car Competições after nine round for poor results, in his place the team called the Argentine driver Mauro Giallombardo for two rounds and Fórmula Truck champion Beto Monteiro for the last round.
 Constantino Júnior return for Stock Car in last round replacing your nephew Lucas Foresti in AMG Motorsport after Foresti received a 30 days preventive suspension for doping.
 Raphael Matos also was suspended for the same reason of Foresti. In his place Schin Racing Team called Argentine driver Néstor Girolami two time Super TC 2000 champion and winner of Stock Car All Star Race at Interlagos with Ricardo Mauricio.

Race calendar and results
The provisional 2015 schedule was announced on 18 November 2014. The seventh edition of the Schin Million was held on August 16 in Goiânia; the season was contested over twenty-one races at twelve rounds, with the first round – also to be held in Goiânia – being contested by two-driver entries with wildcard drivers. The Ribeirão Preto Street Circuit returned to the series after one year off the schedule, and was be held in April. Later in the season, it was announced that the race on the Salvador was to be replaced by a race at Curitiba. All races were held in Brazil.

Championship standings
Points system
Points were awarded for each race at an event, to the driver/s of a car that completed at least 75% of the race distance and was running at the completion of the race, up to a maximum of 48 points per event.

Dual Race: Used for the first round with Wildcard drivers.
Feature races: Used for the first race of each event and the Stock Car Million race.
Sprint races: Used for the second race of each event, with partially reversed (top ten) grid.
Final race: Used for the last round of the season with double points.

Drivers' Championship

Notes

Teams' Championship

References

External links
  

Stock Car Brasil seasons
Stock Car Brasil season